Daniel Wring (born 26 October 1986) is an English former professional footballer who plays for Larkhall Athletic. He is a midfielder.

Wring began his career as a trainee with Bristol City. He made his league debut, while still a trainee, as a late substitute for Joe Anyinsah on 7 May 2005 in City's 3–2 win away to Sheffield Wednesday. He turned professional in April 2006, but failed to add to his single first team appearance for City and was released at the end of the 2006–07 season.

Wring joined Torquay United in June 2007, making his Conference National debut as a second-half substitute for Danny Stevens in Torquay's 3–1 win away to Northwich Victoria on 18 August 2007. He played just six times for Torquay, all as a substitute, and left the club by mutual consent on 31 January 2008. He joined Team Bath and was a regular member of their side that won promotion to the Conference South.

In the 2008 close season he had trials with Worcester City, Weston-super-Mare and Newport County, eventually signing for Newport. However, he left in August 2008 to join Mangotsfield United, leaving them in December 2008 to join local rivals Clevedon Town. In 2010, he signed for Chippenham Town F.C. After spells at Bath City and Bideford, he signed for Weston-super-Mare for the 2015–16 season.

References

External links

Living people
1986 births
English footballers
Bristol City F.C. players
Torquay United F.C. players
Team Bath F.C. players
Newport County A.F.C. players
Mangotsfield United F.C. players
Clevedon Town F.C. players
Chippenham Town F.C. players
Bath City F.C. players
Bideford A.F.C. players
Weston-super-Mare A.F.C. players
Association football midfielders